The men's pursuit competition at the Biathlon World Championships 2019 was held on 10 March 2019.

Results
The race was started at 16:30.

References

Men's pursuit